Eric Ferguson (born 11 May 1955) is an Australian former professional rugby league footballer who played for Eastern Suburbs and the South Sydney Rabbitohs.

Biography
An Indigenous Australian, Ferguson grew up as the middle sibling of nine children and lived in the New South Wales towns of Rappville, Byron Bay and Griffith. He played his early rugby league for Yenda, captaining the under 18s in 1968. While playing in Newcastle he was recruited by Eastern Suburbs.

Ferguson, a fullback and occasional winger, played first-grade for Eastern Suburbs from 1974 to 1977, but didn't feature regularly.

At South Sydney he received more time in first-grade and became a reliable goal-kicker for the club. In a 1978 game against Cronulla he kicked nine goals from nine attempts. He helped South Sydney make the finals in 1980, kicking the winning sideline conversion against North Sydney in Round 19, with less than two-minutes to play. South Sydney ultimately edged into the finals by a point and Ferguson made his only finals appearances against St. George at the SCG.

References

External links
Eric Ferguson at Rugby League project

1955 births
Living people
Australian rugby league players
Indigenous Australian rugby league players
Sydney Roosters players
South Sydney Rabbitohs players
Rugby league fullbacks
Rugby league wingers
Rugby league players from Casino, New South Wales